Bernard Lazare (14 June 1865, Nîmes – 1 September 1903, Paris) was a French literary critic, political journalist, polemicist, and anarchist. He was also among the first Dreyfusards.

Life

Lazare's initial contact with symbolists introduced him to anarchism and led to his career in literary criticism. During the Trial of the thirty in 1894, he defended anarchists Jean Grave and Félix Fénéon.

Following his experience with antisemitism during the Dreyfus Affair, Lazare became engaged in the struggle for the emancipation of Jews, and was triumphally received at the First Zionist Congress. He travelled with Zionist leader Theodor Herzl, the two men sharing a great respect for each other, but he fell out with Herzl after a disagreement over the project whose "tendencies, processes and actions" he disapproved. In 1899 he wrote to Herzl – and by extension to the Zionist Action Committee, "You are bourgeois in thoughts, bourgeois in your feelings, bourgeois in your ideas, bourgeois in your conception of society." Lazare's Zionism was not nationalist, nor advocated the creation of a state, but was rather an ideal of emancipation and of collective organization of the Jewish proletarians.

He visited Romania in 1900 and 1902, after which he denounced the terrible fate of Romanian Jews in L'Aurore, written in July and August 1900. He also visited Russia where he reported on the dangers facing Jews, but did not have a chance to publish due to illness; and Turkey where he defended the Armenians against persecution.

Soon Dreyfusardes censored him and he could no longer write for l'Aurore after the Rennes trial. He covered the trial anyway and sent his vitriolic accounts to two American journals, The Chicago Record and The North American Review. At the end of his life, he became close to Charles Péguy, and wrote in the Cahiers de la quinzaine.

Works

Non-fiction
 L'Antisémitisme, son histoire et ses causes (tr. as Anti-semitism, its History and Causes) (1894)

Fiction
Le Miroir des Légendes (Alphonse Lemarre, 1892) (tr. as The Mirror of Legends, 2017) 
Les Porteurs des Torches (1897) 
Les Portes d'ivoire (1898)

See also
 Anarchism in France

References

Further reading 
 L'antisémitisme son histoire et ses causes (1894 – Léon Chailley Ed.) Text in English; epub: 
 Le nationalisme juif (1898)
 L'affaire Dreyfus – Une erreur judiciaire – Edition établie par Ph. Oriol, – Ed. Allia (1993) (Job's Dungheap, edition in English with introduction by Hannah Arendt)
 Le fumier de Job – Texte établi par Ph. Oriol – Ed. Honoré Champion (1998)
 Juifs et antisémites – Edition établie par Ph. Oriol – Ed. Allia (1992)
 Bernard Lazare, Anarchiste et nationaliste juif – Textes réunis par Ph. Oriol – Ed. Honoré Champion (1999)
 Bernard Lazare – de l'anarchiste au prophète – J-D Bredin – Ed. fallois (1992)
 Bernard Lazare – Ph. Oriol – Stock (2003)

External links
 Homage to Bernard Lazare by Mitchell Cohen
 Writings of Lazare at Marxist Internet Archive
 Anti-Semitism, Its History and Its Causes by Bernard Lazare Free online book for download in adobe PDF format 991KB.
 Dreyfus Rehabilitated

1865 births
1903 deaths
People from Nîmes
19th-century French Jews
Activists against antisemitism
French anarchists
Jewish anarchists
Jewish socialists
Anarchist writers
French literary critics
French journalists
French essayists
Jewish French writers
Jewish activists
Writers on antisemitism
Dreyfusards
French male essayists